Cavaglio d'Agogna is a comune (municipality) in the Province of Novara in the Italian region Piedmont, located about  northeast of Turin and about  northwest of Novara.

Cavaglio d'Agogna borders the following municipalities: Barengo, Cavaglietto, Fara Novarese, Fontaneto d'Agogna, Ghemme, and Sizzano.

References

Cities and towns in Piedmont